Henrik Ottesen (born 29 January 1934) is a Danish boxer. He competed in the men's bantamweight event at the 1956 Summer Olympics.

References

External links
 

1934 births
Living people
Danish male boxers
Olympic boxers of Denmark
Boxers at the 1956 Summer Olympics
People from Skive Municipality
Bantamweight boxers
Sportspeople from the Central Denmark Region